The Runners Four is the seventh studio album by American indie rock band Deerhoof, released on October 11, 2005 by Kill Rock Stars, ATP Recordings and 5 Rue Christine. A vinyl edition with a different cover was released by the label Children of Hoof.

Track listing

Personnel
 Chris Cohen – bass, vocals
 John Dieterich – guitar, vocals
 Satomi Matsuzaki – guitar, vocals
 Greg Saunier – drums, vocals

Charts

References

Deerhoof albums
2005 albums
Kill Rock Stars albums
5 Rue Christine albums